The Universidad del Salvador (USAL) is a Jesuit university in Buenos Aires, Argentina. In addition to its campus in downtown Buenos Aires, it has instructional and research facilities in Pilar, San Miguel, Bahía Blanca, and in the provinces of Santa Cruz and Misiones. As of 2012, approximately 20,000 undergraduate and over 8,000 graduate students were enrolled.

History
The Society of Jesus (Jesuits), which had founded the first Argentine university in the city of Córdoba in 1622, created the Superior Institute of Philosophy in the seat of the Colegio del Salvador (primary and secondary levels). This Institute was the nearest predecessor for the Universidad del Salvador.

Private universities were authorized in 1955, and on May 2 of the following year the Foundation Act of the "University Faculties of Salvador" was signed. On May 15, 1958, the name was changed to the University Institutes of Salvador, and finally to Universidad del Salvador on December 8, 1959.

In March 1975, the Jesuits entrusted management of the university to a group of lay people, who took on the responsibility of keeping the identity of the Universidad del Salvador by meeting Jesuit goals and aims. Institutional direction is still governed by the Jesuits, who appoint authorities through the Civil Association Universidad del Salvador.

Faculties and schools
         
 Faculty of Administration 
 Faculty of Economic Sciencies 
 Faculty of Education & Social Communications 
 Faculty of Law
 Faculty of Social Sciences
 Faculty of History, Geography & Tourism
 Faculty of Medicine
 
 Faculty of Psychology & Psychopedagogy
 Faculty of Science & Technology
 School of Agronomy
 School of Veterinary Medicine
 School of Design
 School of Art and Architecture
 School of Oriental Studies
 School of Modern Languages

See also
 List of Jesuit sites

References

External links
 Official Website 

Private universities in Argentina
Catholic universities and colleges in Argentina
Education in Buenos Aires
Jesuit universities and colleges
Educational institutions established in 1958
Universities in Buenos Aires Province
1958 establishments in Argentina